These are the 198 municipalities of the canton of Aargau, Switzerland.

List 

Aarau
Aarburg
Abtwil
Ammerswil
Aristau
Arni
Auenstein
Auw
Baden
Beinwil (Freiamt)
Beinwil am See
Bellikon
Bergdietikon
Berikon
Besenbüren
Bettwil
Biberstein
Birmenstorf
Birr
Birrhard
Birrwil
Boniswil
Boswil
Bottenwil
Böttstein
Bözberg
Böztal
Bremgarten
Brittnau
Brugg
Brunegg
Buchs
Bünzen
Büttikon
Buttwil
Densbüren
Dietwil
Dintikon
Dottikon
Döttingen
Dürrenäsch
Eggenwil
Egliswil
Ehrendingen
Eiken
Endingen
Ennetbaden
Erlinsbach
Fahrwangen
Fischbach-Göslikon
Fisibach
Fislisbach
Freienwil
Frick
Full-Reuenthal
Gansingen
Gebenstorf
Geltwil
Gipf-Oberfrick
Gontenschwil
Gränichen
Habsburg
Hägglingen
Hallwil
Hausen bei Brugg
Hellikon
Hendschiken
Herznach-Ueken
Hirschthal
Holderbank
Holziken
Hunzenschwil
Islisberg
Jonen
Kaiseraugst
Kaisten
Kallern
Killwangen
Kirchleerau
Klingnau
Koblenz
Kölliken
Künten
Küttigen
Laufenburg
Leibstadt
Leimbach
Lengnau
Lenzburg
Leuggern
Leutwil
Lupfig
Magden
Mägenwil
Mandach
Meisterschwanden
Mellikon
Mellingen
Menziken
Merenschwand
Mettauertal
Möhlin
Mönthal
Moosleerau
Möriken-Wildegg
Muhen
Mühlau
Mülligen
Mumpf
Münchwilen
Murgenthal
Muri
Neuenhof
Niederlenz
Niederrohrdorf
Niederwil
Oberentfelden
Oberhof
Oberkulm
Oberlunkhofen
Obermumpf
Oberrohrdorf
Oberrüti
Obersiggenthal
Oberwil-Lieli
Oeschgen
Oftringen
Olsberg
Othmarsingen
Reinach
Reitnau
Remetschwil
Remigen
Rheinfelden
Riniken
Rothrist
Rottenschwil
Rudolfstetten-Friedlisberg
Rüfenach
Rupperswil
Safenwil
Sarmenstorf
Schafisheim
Schinznach
Schlossrued
Schmiedrued
Schneisingen
Schöftland
Schupfart
Schwaderloch
Seengen
Seon
Siglistorf
Sins
Sisseln
Spreitenbach
Staffelbach
Staufen
Stein
Stetten
Strengelbach
Suhr
Tägerig
Tegerfelden
Teufenthal
Thalheim
Turgi
Uerkheim
Uezwil
Unterentfelden
Unterkulm
Unterlunkhofen
Untersiggenthal
Veltheim
Villigen
Villmergen
Villnachern
Vordemwald
Wallbach
Waltenschwil
Wegenstetten
Wettingen
Widen
Wiliberg
Windisch
Wittnau
Wohlen
Wohlenschwil
Wölflinswil
Würenlingen
Würenlos
Zeihen
Zeiningen
Zetzwil
Zofingen
Zufikon
Zurzach
Zuzgen

Changes

Mergers
As with most Swiss cantons there has been a trend since the early 2000s for municipalities to merge, though mergers in Aargau have so far been less radical than in other cantons.

The following mergers between the canton's municipalities have occurred since 2000:

2002: Mühlethal merged into Zofingen
2006: Oberehrendingen and Unterehrendingen combined to create Ehrendingen
2006: Stilli merged into Villigen
2010: Hilfikon merged into Villmergen
2010: Rohr merged into Aarau
2010: Etzgen, Hottwil, Mettau, Oberhofen and Wil combined to create Mettauertal
2010: Umiken merged into Brugg
2010: Sulz merged into Laufenburg
2010: Ittenthal merged into Kaisten
2012: Benzenschwil merged into Merenschwand
2013: Gallenkirch, Linn, Oberbözberg and Unterbözberg combined to create Bözberg
2014: Hermetschwil-Staffeln merged into Bremgarten
2014: Oberflachs and Schinznach-Dorf combined to create Schinznach
2014: Unterendingen merged into Endingen
2018: Scherz merged into Lupfig
2019: Attelwil merged into Reitnau
2020: Schinznach-Bad merged into Brugg
2022: Bad Zurzach, Baldingen, Böbikon, Kaiserstuhl, Rekingen, Rietheim, Rümikon and Wislikofen combined to create Zurzach
2022: Bözen, Effingen, Elfingen and Hornussen combined to create Böztal
2023: Herznach and Ueken combined to create Herznach-Ueken
2023: Burg merged into Menziken

Separations
1983: Arni-Islisberg split into two new municipalities — Arni and Islisberg

Name changes
1984: Oberwil became Oberwil-Lieli

References

Aargau

Aargau